The name Ursula has been used for five tropical cyclones worldwide, three in the Western North Pacific Ocean and two in the South Pacific Ocean.

In the Western North Pacific:
 Typhoon Ursula (1945) – Category 2-equivalent typhoon, made landfall on Taiwan and in China.
 Tropical Depression Ursula (2003) (22W) – crossed Palawan before dissipating.
 Typhoon Phanfone (2019) (T1929, 30W, Ursula) – Category 3-equivalent typhoon, struck the Philippines resulting in at least 50 deaths and $67.2 million (2019 USD) in damages.
Ursula was retired by PAGASA following the 2019 season and replaced with Ungong for the 2023 season.

In the South Pacific:
 Cyclone Ursula (1971) – Category 2-equivalent tropical cyclone, did not affect land.
 Cyclone Ursula (1998) – Category 1-equivalent tropical cyclone, passed through French Polynesia's Tuamotu Islands.

Pacific typhoon set index articles
Australian region cyclone set index articles
South Pacific cyclone set index articles